Mammillaria nivosa is a species of cactus also known by the name woolly nipple cactus and is native to the Caribbean.

Description

References

nivosa